The Book of Folly is a 1972 collection of poetry by American writer Anne Sexton.

References

1972 books
Poetry by Anne Sexton
American poetry collections
Houghton Mifflin books